The Jubalaires were an American gospel group active between 1940 and 1950. Previously known as the Royal Harmony Singers in 1936, the band was known for song verses delivered in a rhythmic, rhyming style that has been described as an early version of rapping, their 1946 song "Noah" being often named as the first recorded instance of rap.

History 
The band reached #10 on the R&B charts on November 14, 1942, with "Praise the Lord and Pass the Ammunition" a song adapted from the speech of a naval chaplain in response to the attack on Pearl Harbor the previous year. Other releases included "Before This Time Another Year/Ezekiel (Saw the Wheel A Rollin')" (released under the Decca Records label), "God Almighty's Gonna Cut You Down/Go Down Moses" (King Records), and "My God Called Me This Morning/Ring That Golden Bell" (King Records).

The band recorded with Andy Kirk on November 27, 1945, a session which produced the Decca Records 78rpm release "I Know/Get Together with the Lord" credited to Andy Kirk & His Orchestra with the Jubalaires. A third track recorded during the session, "Soothe Me", went unreleased.

In 1946, the Jubalaires secured a spot on Arthur Godfrey's CBS radio show. Willie Johnson left the Golden Gate Quartet to take the lead of the group in 1948, and in 1950 the band appeared in the musical comedy film Duchess of Idaho.

The band's recording of "Dreaming of the Ladies in the Moon" (Crown Records) attracted the praise of Billboard magazine, which gave the record a mark of 78/100 in the 17 April 1954 issue, commenting that "The boys here come thru with a strong reading on a bright ballad with an evocative flavor." The reviewer compared the Jubalaires' treatment of the song with the style of the Mills Brothers and predicted it could become a break-out hit. In the 15 December 1951 issue, Billboard praised the group's performance on the release "David and Goliath/I've Done My Work" (Capitol Records). However, in the 4 August 1951 issue, the praise provided did not mention the song "Rain is the Teardrops of Angels/Keep on Doin' What You're Doin."

Most of the music by the Jubalaires was released by Queen Records, a King Records subsidiary specializing in African-American music. However, later reissues of their music would appear under King Records.

Band members 
Original members

 Orville Brooks, vocals (born January 27, 1919, died August 30, 1997)
 Theodore Brooks, vocals (born 1915, died 1997)
 Caleb Ginyard, vocals (born January 15, 1910, died August 11, 1978)
 George McFadden, vocals

Other members

 Willie Johnson

References

External links
 
 "The Jubalaires" – extensive article by Karen Caplan prepared for the 8th annual United in Harmony Association Hall of Fame Ceremony held on April 4, 1998
 "The Jubalaires" by Tony Fournier

American gospel musical groups
Capitol Records artists
Decca Records artists
King Records artists
Men's musical groups
Vocal ensembles
Musical groups established in 1936